Lakkom Water Falls, also known as Lakkam Waterfalls, is a tourist attraction located near Marayoor in the Idukki district of Kerala. These falls are part of the Eravikulam stream, which is a part of Eravikulam National Park and is one of the major tributaries of the Pambar River.

Reaching there
Situated at about 30–35 from Munnar, Lakkom Waterfalls is on the way to Udumalaipettai from Munnar. One can either catch a bus to Udumalaipettai or hire a local taxi from Munnar to reach here. It is on State Highway 17.

Other details 

There are no separate fees for DSLR cameras.

External links 
 Lakkom Waterfalls
 Kerala Tourism
 Lakkom Waterfalls

Waterfalls of Kerala
Waterfalls of Idukki district